LTT 3780, also known as TOI 732 or LP 729-54, is the primary of the binary stellar system LDS 3977 in the constellation Hydra.

Characteristics 
LTT 3780 is an M-type main-sequence star. It is of similar age to Sun and relatively enriched in metals.

Planetary system 
In 2020, an analysis carried out by a team of astronomers led by astronomer Ryan Cloutier of the TESS project confirmed the existence of two planets on mildly eccentric orbits, the inner being a super-Earth and the outer a small gas giant about half the mass of Uranus.

See also 
 List of extrasolar planets
 List of multiplanetary systems

References 

732
M-type main-sequence stars
Hydra (constellation)
Planetary systems with two confirmed planets
Planetary transit variables
Astronomical objects discovered in 2020